Russian folk music specifically deals with the folk music traditions of the ethnic Russian people.

Ethnic styles in the modern era

The performance and promulgation of ethnic music in Russia has a long tradition. Initially it was intertwined with various forms of art music, however, in the late 19th century it began to take on a life of its own with the rise in popularity of folkloric ensembles, such as the folk choir movement led by Mitrofan Pyatnitsky and the Russian folk instrument movement pioneered by Vasily Andreyev.

In Soviet Russia, folk music was categorized as being democratic (of the people) or proletarian (of the working class) as opposed to art music, which was often regarded as being bourgeois. After the revolution, along with proletarian "mass music" (music for the proletarian masses) it received significant support from the state. In Post World War II Russia, proletarian mass music however lost its appeal, whereas folkloric music continued to have a widespread support among the population, inside and outside of the Soviet Union. However the authentic nature of folk music was severely distorted by the drive to 'professionalise' performers, regardless of the genre they worked in: thus all folk singers were obliged to both learn Western-style classical notation, and to learn to perform classical repertoire – or else risk losing their right to perform as 'professionals'.

In the 1960s, folk music in Russia continued to receive significant state support and was often seen as the antithesis of Western pop music. The fact that numerous Soviet folkloric ensembles were invited for foreign tours raised the prestige of the folk performer to that of academic musicians, and in some cases even higher because access to the West and Western goods was very desirable.

Ethnic (folk) music in Russia can often be categorized according to the amount of authenticity in the performance: truly authentic folk music (reproductive performances of traditional music), folkloric and "fakeloric" performance.

Russia is a multi-ethnic country with some 300 different ethnic groups, many of them non-Slavic, living within its borders. This article deals specifically with just Russian ethnic music.

Authentic folk music
This music is closely tied in with village life and traditions. It was usually not performed by professional musicians. From the Central Committee's resolution of 1932, which prescribed musical literacy (in parallel to the drive to industrialise the Soviet Union), there has been a marked decline in authentic folk performance practice. Festivals, competitions and the work of ethnomusicologists have made attempts at preserving what has survived. In recent times there has been a movement by musicologists to study and reproduce authentic folk music in an authentic performance style on the concert stage. This movement in Russia is spearheaded by members of the faculty of folk music at the Moscow Conservatory under the direction of Dmitri Pokrovsky. More recently, Russian folk songs with strong religious (spiritual) components have been performed by singers like Zhanna Bichevskaya, Olga Arefieva and Elena Frolova

Folkloric music
This category includes music by groups led by music professionals, past and present, who have taken authentic musical material, and then arranged and performed it in a manner formulated by Vasily Andreyev and subsequently refined under Stalin's regime, yet widely accepted as 'authentically Russian' by Western audiences (conditioned, for instance, by performances by the Red Army Song and Dance Ensemble). The category includes many of the regional folkloric ensembles and dance companies popular in the Russian Federation. Often these folkloric ensembles specialize in collecting and maintaining the folk music traditions of the area of their origins which they service. They perform in stylized stage costumes based on the authentic costume designs used in the village but modified for stage use. Most inauthentic – but widespread – was the practice of performing so-called Cossack prisiadki (low-squatting dances) in perfect synchronization; as Professor Laura J. Olson observes, 'this situation did not reflect actual Cossack traditions so much as it borrowed from the traditions of Russian ballet that dated to the late nineteenth century'.

Artistic folklore music

This includes music composed by city intelligentsia and professional composers in a folkloric manner. 
Much of the music of the Russian folk instrument orchestras can also be categorized in this group as it is based on academic music traditions and playing techniques only taking a folk element as its inspiration.

As in all western folklore traditions, the distinction is difficult to draw, as in the 19th century, intellectuals would both collect folk music (not always being accurate about their source material) and conflate it with original compositions.

In recent times music professionals who have completed diplomas in noted conservatories performing on Russian folk instruments are now questioning their "folkiness" when they perform, as none of their music was ever really performed originally by the (village) folk. Some now refer to their music as being academic folk music which to many academic musicians is an oxymoron.

Vocal music
Authentic Russian folk music is primarily vocal. Russian folk song was an integral part of daily village life. It was sung from morning to night, and reflected the four seasons and significant events in villagers' lives. Its roots are in the Orthodox church services where significant parts are sung. Most of the population was also illiterate and poverty-stricken, so musical instruments were rare, and notation (which is more relevant for instrumentals than vocals) could not be read.

Authentic village singing differs from academic singing styles. It is usually done using just the chest register and is often called "white sound" or "white" voice. It is often described as controlled screaming or shouting. Female chest register singers have only a low diapason of one octave to 12 notes.

Chest register singing has evolved into a style used by many of Russia's folk choirs and neighbouring countries. It was pioneered by Pyatnitsky and Ukrainian folk choir director Demutsky in the early 1900s.

Notable ensembles include the Pyatnitsky Russian Folk Chorus, the Northern Russian Folk Chorus, the Omsk State Russian Folk Chorus, Beloe Zlato, the Alexandrov Song and Dance Ensemble of the Soviet Army and the Moscow Military Area Song and Dance Ensemble.

Instrumental music
Instrumental music for a long period was suppressed in Russia. In 1648, Tsar Alexis I of Russia banned the use of certain musical instruments. Some historians believe that skomorokhs singing disrespectful songs about the Tsar to instrumental accompaniment could have been the reason.  As a result of the ban, instrumental music traditions disappeared and did not have a fertile ground for development in Russia for many years. No musical instruments are used in Orthodox churches (in Russia).

In the late 19th century, Vasily Andreyev, a salon violinist, took up the balalaika in his performances for French tourists to Petersburg. The music became popular and soon Andreyev had organized a club of balalaika players. This club grew into an orchestra, which in time grew into a movement.

Alexey Arhipovsky is considered the modern-day Russian Paganini of the balalaika, but with a Pat Metheny approach. During his tours he has gained many admiring fans who compared him with Paganini and Jimi Hendrix: “One would [sic] think that a three string instrument tuned E-E-A would have much potential, but you then haven’t heard Alexei Arkhipovskiy yet... [who] shows that he is the Russian Paganini.”  “[He] became a sensation immediately after the first appearance in front of the general public. He practically wrecked the Guitar festival ... showing incredible musical mastery. It was a real Theatre of inexpressible play and giddy performing numbers, MIME and gesture. Many hearers compared [him] no less than with great Jimi Hendrix" 

From a simple unsophisticated three-stringed instrument, combined with an awakening 'Russianness' in the last phases of the Tsarist Empire, the movement led to the development and implementation of many other Russian folk instruments. The Russian folk instrument movement had its resonance in the cultures of other ethnic groups within Russia, the Soviet Union, and the Soviet Bloc countries. Folk instrument orchestras appeared in Belarus, Ukraine, Kyrgyzstan, Yugoslavia, Bulgaria, Moldavia, and Romania.

Traditional instruments

Chordophones
Balalaika, a three-stringed, triangular sound-board, played with the fingers. It comes in many different sizes, prima being the most common. Two of the strings are tuned alike in descant, prima, secunda, and alto balalaikas.
Domra, a small three- or four-stringed Russian variant of the mandolin with a rounded soundboard, plucked or strummed with a plectrum. It is also made in various orchestral sizes. Originally they were all three-stringed (E-A-D). The four-string variety was developed by in the early 20th century and became popular in Ukraine.
Gudok (also hudok), a three-stringed, pear-shaped Russian bowed instrument tuned in fifths which is usually held vertically.
Gusli, one of the oldest known Eastern Slav musical instruments, described by the Greeks as early as the 6th century AD.  Many different varieties of this plucked string instrument exist.
Kolyosnaya lira (Wheeled Lyre), a Russian version of the hurdy-gurdy usually made with a violoncello body.
Semistrunnaya gitara (Semistrunka, Russian guitar), a seven string version of the acoustic guitar with its own preferred method of construction and unique open G major tuning.

Aerophones
Bayan, a chromatic button accordion
Garmon, a kind of diatonic Russian button accordion, featuring a unique unisonoric design
Kalyuki, a hollow pipe with no additional air holes, used for whistling sounds
Kugikli/Kuvikly, simple panpipes
Svirel, a Russian flute
Vladimirsky rozhok, a type of horn made in Russia's Vladimir Oblast by shepherds who composed melodious calls on it. It has a range of two octaves and a very distinctive idiosyncratic sound.
Volynka, a traditional Slavic bagpipe
Zhaleika, a Russian folk clarinet/hornpipe

Idiophones
Buben, an equivalent of the tambourine
Bubentsy
Vargan, an equivalent of the jew's harp
Korobochka, an equivalent of the wood block
Derevaynnie Lozhki, an equivalent of spoons
Rubel, an equivalent of the washboard
Treshchotka, an equivalent of the clapper
Zvonchalka

Recurring elements in singing

The "Ahy luli luli lui” or "Ohy loli loli loi" phrase is characteristic for Russian folk songs and is sung by women.

Whistling is very common in Russian folk songs.

The exclamation "Opa", also "Op op" and sometimes "Ota" is also a common characteristic of Russian folk music and is used by female and male singers.

Also, various exclamations of the Cossacks are represented in many Russian folk songs.

See also
 Sergey Nikolaevich Starostin
 Ivan Kupala (band)
 Pelageya
 Zhanna Bichevskaya
 Olga Glazova
 Music of Russia

References

Further reading

External links

, and by trio of  
Golosá: Russian Folk Choir of the University of Chicago
Official Website of the Osipov State Russian Folk Orchestra – one of Russia's leading folk orchestras with about 80 members.  Some mp3 clips can be downloaded.
Music from Russia and Nearby Regions
Russian folk music
Andreyev State Russian Orchestra
Chicago Cossacks – Russian Folk Group in Chicago
 State Academic North-Russian Folk Ensemble / www.sevhor.ru

 
Folk music by country